Ada Rosa del Valle Itúrrez de Cappellini is an Argentine Justicialist Party politician. She was a National Senator for Santiago del Estero Province from 2007 to 2019, elected for the Civic Front for Santiago and supporting the majority block of the Front for Victory.

Cappellini served as Mayor of Villa Ojo de Agua, a position later held by her husband. She then served as a provincial deputy. In the provincial legislature she led the Bases Populares block. In 2007 Cappellini was elected to the Argentine Senate for the Civic Front of Santiago, a front formed in 2005 by Radicals and Peronists. She and her fellow Civic Front senator Emilio Rached form their own block but support the Kirchners' Front for Victory.

External links
Senate profile

References

Living people
People from Santiago del Estero Province
Justicialist Party politicians
Members of the Argentine Senate for Santiago del Estero
Women mayors of places in Argentina
1959 births
Women members of the Argentine Senate